The Codex Brixianus (Brescia, Biblioteca Civica Queriniana, s.n.), designated by f, is a 6th-century Latin Gospel Book which was probably produced in Italy.

Description
The manuscript contains 419 folios.  The text, written on purple dyed vellum in silver ink, is a version of the old Latin translation which seems to be connected with the Gothic translation of Ulfilas.  At the base of each page is an arcade very similar to that found in the Codex Argenteus. Furthermore, the Latin text shows readings which seem to be influenced by the Gothic Bible translation.

Text
It has some lacunae.

It was named Brixianus after Brescia in Italy, where it is housed.

In Luke 7:31, it contains the phrase "tunc ergo iesus dixit".
In John 11:41, alone of all the Old Latin Gospels, it had in the original hand the truncated reading "ubi fuerat", a translation of ου ην, the reading of A, K, P, 0211, 0250, f1, 22, 579, al. This matches the Gothic reading "þarei was."

See also 

 Purple parchment
 List of New Testament Latin manuscripts

References

Further reading 
 Ms.Purpureo, full reproduction of the codex.
 

6th-century biblical manuscripts
Purple parchment
Brixianus
Vetus Latina New Testament manuscripts
6th-century illuminated manuscripts